Sarasota, Florida has 71 structures that have been placed on the National Register of Historic Places. Several additional historic buildings have been proposed for listing.

 American National Bank Building
 Appleby Building
 Atlantic Coast Line Passenger Depot
 Bacheller-Brewer Model Home Estate
 Bacon and Tomlin, Inc.
 Bay Haven School
 Bee Ridge Woman's Club
 Bidwell-Wood House
 Frank and Matilda Binz House
 Bispham-Wilson Historic District
 Blalock House
 Bryson-Crane House
 William J. Burns House
 Burns Court Historic District
 Burns Realty Company-Karl Bickel House
 Caples and Ringling Estates Historic District
 Ellen and Ralph Caples residence
 John and Mable Ringling Museum of Art
 John and Mable Ringling residence, Cà d'Zan
 Edith and Charles Ringling residence
 Hester Ringling Landcaster Sanford residence
 Casa Del Mar
 Central-Cocoanut Historic District
 Crocker Church
 City Waterworks
 Corrigan House
 Crisp Building
 F. A. DeCanizares House
 DeMarcay Hotel
 Earle House
 Edwards Theatre
 El Patio Apartments
 El Vernona Apartments-Broadway Apartments
 El Vernona Hotel-John Ringling Hotel
 Field Estate
 Frances-Carlton Apartments
 Dr. Joseph Halton House
 Harding Circle Historic District
 House at 507 Jackson Drive
 Edson Keith Estate
 Frank Guptill house 
 Dr. Walter Kennedy House
 S. H. Kress Building
 Hilton Leech House and Amagansett Art School
 Laurel Park Historic District
 Levillain-Letton House
 Maine Colony Historic District
 Municipal Auditorium-Recreation Club
 Out of Door School
 Overtown Historic District
 Christy Payne Mansion
 Capt. W. F. Purdy House
 L.D. Reagin House
 Leonard Reid House
 Loonkk's house
 Rigby's La Plaza Historic District
 John and Mable Ringling Museum of Art
 Rosemary Cemetery
 Roth Cigar Factory
 Sanderling Beach Club
 Sarasota County Courthouse
 Sarasota Herald Building
 Sarasota High School
 Sarasota Times Building
 Sarasota Woman's Club
 George Schueler House
 Seagate
 South Side School
 Southwick-Harmon House
 Thoms House
 U.S. Post Office-Federal Building (Sarasota, Florida) 
 J. G. Whitfield Estate
 H. B. William House
 Dr. C. B. Wilson House
 Worth's Block

See also
 National Register of Historic Places listings in Sarasota County, Florida

References

External links
National Register of Historic Places
Florida Heritage Tourism Interactive Catalog, Sarasota County Listings

Buildings and structures in Sarasota, Florida
Sarasota
Sarasota